The  is an archaeological site with the ruins of  late Nara period to Heian period government tax warehouse complex located in the Yoshiimachiike neighborhood of the city of Takasaki, Gunma Prefecture in the northern Kantō region of Japan. It was designated a National Historic Site of Japan in 2020.

Overview
Each of the units had an administrative complex built on a semi-standardized layout based on contemporary Chinese design, with rectangular layout surrounded by a moat, earthen ramparts and wooden palisade. Within were the administrative buildings, typically in a "U" shape, and often within a secondary enclosure. Either within the primary enclosure, or else nearby was a group of warehouses arranged in regularly spaced rows, protected by its own palisade and moat. These warehouses were granaries used for storing rice or other produce, which was collected as taxation from the local inhabitants. 

From its inscription, this complex was built in 711 AD. The warehouse complex with granaries for storing tax rice was in a compound 210 meters from north-to-south and 55 meters from east-to-west on its northern border. It is uncertain if the compound was square, or trapezoidal, as the southern borders has not yet been confirmed. The compound was surrounded by a moat with a width of two to three meters. Within, an archaeological excavation confirmed the cornerstones marking the locations of two buildings, and from the distribution of other stones and large accumulation of roof tile shards, it is estimated that many other buildings existed within this area. One of the buildings confirmed was at north end of the compound, and was a large 3 x 7 bay structure, which may have been the actual kanga office.

See also
List of Historic Sites of Japan (Gunma)

References

External links
Takasaki City official guide 

History of Gunma Prefecture
Takasaki, Gunma
Archaeological sites in Japan
Historic Sites of Japan
Kōzuke Province